Harald Warholm (21 July 1920 – 10 February 1967) was a Norwegian politician for the Conservative Party.

He was born in Brønnøy.

Warholm was elected to the Norwegian Parliament from Nordland in 1958, and was re-elected on two occasions. He died midway through his third term, and was replaced by Bodil Aakre.

Harald Warholm was a member of Brønnøysund municipality council in the period 1959–1963 and of its successor municipality Brønnøy in 1963–1967.

References

1920 births
1967 deaths
Conservative Party (Norway) politicians
Members of the Storting
20th-century Norwegian politicians
People from Brønnøy